Schnitler is a surname. Notable people with the surname include:

Carl Wille Schnitler (1879–1926), Norwegian art historian
Diderik Schnitler (born 1946), Norwegian businessman
Didrik Thomas Johannes Schnitler (1833-1888), Norwegian military officer and historian
Gudmund Schnitler (1868–1925), Norwegian military officer and historian
Gunvor Margaret Schnitler, Norwegian politician
Peter Schnitler (1690–1751), Danish/Norwegian jurist and military officer